Roberta Brunet (born 20 May 1965 in Aosta) is a former middle distance runner from Italy

Biography
Roberta Brunet won four medals, at individual level, at the International athletics competitions. She participated at four editions of the Summer Olympics (1988, 1992, 1996 and 2000), she has 41 caps in sixteen years in national team from 1983 to 2000. She won a bronze medal in the European Championships in 3,000 metres in 1990 and then won a bronze medal in the 5,000 metres at the 1996 Summer Olympics, a silver medal in the same discipline at the 1997 World Championships and a bronze medal in the 3,000 metres at the 1990 European Championships. She is a two-time national champion in the women's 5.000 metres.

National titles
Roberta Brunet has won 13 times the individual national championship.
5 wins in the 1500 metres (1985, 1986, 1988, 1989, 1990)
6 wins in the 3000 metres (1986, 1988, 1989, 1990, 1992, 1994)
2 wins in the 5000 metres (1996, 2000)

Personal bests
800 metres - 2:05.63 (1996)
1500 metres - 4:08.65 (1996)
2000 metres - 5:32.83 (1996)
3000 metres - 8:35.65 (1997)
5000 metres - 14:44.50 (1996)
10000 metres - 32:12.13 (1996)

See also
 Italian all-time top lists - 5000 metres
 Italian all-time top lists - 10000 metres

References

External links
 

1965 births
Living people
People from Aosta
Olympic athletes of Italy
Olympic bronze medalists for Italy
Italian female middle-distance runners
Italian female long-distance runners
Athletes (track and field) at the 1988 Summer Olympics
Athletes (track and field) at the 1992 Summer Olympics
Athletes (track and field) at the 1996 Summer Olympics
Athletes (track and field) at the 2000 Summer Olympics
World Athletics Championships athletes for Italy
World Athletics Championships medalists
European Athletics Championships medalists
Medalists at the 1996 Summer Olympics
Olympic bronze medalists in athletics (track and field)
Mediterranean Games gold medalists for Italy
Athletes (track and field) at the 1991 Mediterranean Games
Athletes (track and field) at the 1997 Mediterranean Games
Sportspeople from Aosta Valley
Mediterranean Games medalists in athletics